NFIB can refer to:

National Federation of Independent Business, a United States organization representing the interests of small businesses
National Federation of Independent Business v. Sebelius, a United States Supreme Court case that challenged the Affordable Care Act
National Foreign Intelligence Board, was a US government group of intelligence officials.
National Fraud Intelligence Bureau, a United Kingdom police unit responsible for gathering and analysing intelligence on fraud and financially motivated cyber crime
Nuclear factor I/B, a human gene